Tabernaemontana tomentosa is a species of plant in the family Apocynaceae. It is endemic to Mexico.

References

tomentosa
Endemic flora of Mexico
Least concern plants
Taxonomy articles created by Polbot